Makhach Dalgatovich Murtazaliev (born 4 June 1984 in Kedy, Dagestan, Russia) is an Avar born-Russian Olympic wrestler who won the bronze medal for Russia at the 2004 Summer Olympics in Athens.

In 2006, he went up to the next weight category and was the 2007 World and European champion at 74 kg.

References

External links
 

Olympic wrestlers of Russia
Wrestlers at the 2004 Summer Olympics
Olympic bronze medalists for Russia
1984 births
Living people
Olympic medalists in wrestling
World Wrestling Championships medalists
Russian male sport wrestlers
Medalists at the 2004 Summer Olympics
Sportspeople from Dagestan